Colegio de Montalban (CdM) (formerly as the Pamantasan ng Montalban) is a government-funded university in Kasiglahan Village, Rodriguez, Rizal, Philippines. It was established on September 25, 2003 by virtue of Municipal Ordinance No. 03-24, and approved by the Sangguniang Bayan ng Rodriguez to provide vocational-technical and higher education to help alleviate poverty.  

From July 2004 to July 2010, CdM was under the administration of Mayor Pedro S. Cuerpo, who was subsequently succeeded by Mayor Cecilio C. Hernandez since July 2010.  

On July 7, 2014, by virtue of Sangguniang Bayan ng Rodriguez Ordinance No. 14-15, Pamantasan ng Montalban was renamed Colegio de Montalban.

History 

The Pamantasan ng Montalban was established on September 25, 2003 through Municipal Ordinance No. 03-24 and approved by the Sanguniang Bayan ng Rodriguez.  On the following year, a couple of ordinances were approved by the council to fund and operate the college.  On November 5, 2004, Technical Education and Skills Development Authority (TESDA) granted the college the authority to offer the following two-year courses: Nursing Aide, Civil Technology, Computer Technology, and Garments Technology..

From 2005 to 2009, the Commission on Higher Education (CHED) granted the college several permits and certificates to operate the following courses: 

 Bachelor of Science in Entrepreneurial Management (CHED Regional Order No. 004)
 Bachelor of Science in Commerce Major in Management (CHED Regional Order No. 005)
 Bachelor of Elementary Education with Concentration in Early Childhood Education (CHED Order No. 006)
 2nd Year level of Bachelor of Elementary Education with Concentration in Early Childhood Education (CHED Order No. 007 Series of 2005)
 2nd Year level of Bachelor of Science in Commerce Major in Management (CHED Order No. 002 Series of 2006)
 Bachelor of Science in Civil Engineering (CHED Order No. 004 Series of 2006)
 Bachelor of Science in Computer Engineering (CHED Order No. 003 Series of 2006)
 2nd Year level of Bachelor of Science in Civil Engineering (CHED Order No. 004 Series 2007)
 3rd Year level of Bachelor of Elementary Education with Concentration in Early Childhood Education (CHED Order No. 003 Series of 2007)
 3rd Year level of Bachelor of Science in Entrepreneurship (BSE) (CHED Regional Order No. 007 Series of 2007)
 Bachelor of Science in Commerce Major in Management (BSCM) (CHED Regional Order No. 007 Series of 2007)
 Certificate of Recognition for the 4-year Bachelor of Elementary Education with Area of Concentration in Early Childhood Education (BEED-ECED) and Content Courses (BEED-CC)
 Certificate of Recognition for the 4-year Bachelor of Secondary Education Majors in Biological Science (BSED-BIOSCI)
 Certificate of Recognition for Physical Science (BSED-PHYSCI)
 Certificate of Recognition for Technology and Livelihood Education (BSED-TLE) 
 Certificate of Recognition for the 1st and 2nd Year level of Bachelor of Science in Information Technology (BSIT)
 Certificate of Compliance for the 3rd Year level of Civil Engineering (BSCE)
 Certificate of Compliance for the 2nd Year level of Computer Engineering (BSCPE)
 Certificate of Compliance for the Bachelor of Science in Entrepreneurship (BSE) 
 Certificate of Compliance for the Bachelor of Science in Business Administration Major in Human Resource Development Management (BSBA-HRDM)
 Certificate of Compliance for the 3rd Year level of Bachelor of Science in Information Technology (BSIT)
 Certificate of Compliance for the 4th Year level of Bachelor of Science in Civil Engineering (BSCE)

On 2011, CHED granted the college Full Government Recognition on the following courses: 

 Bachelor of Elementary Education with Area of Concentration in Early Childhood Education (BEED-ECED)
 Bachelor of Elementary Education with Area of Concentration in Content Courses (BEED-CC) with GR No. 012
 Bachelor of Secondary Education Major in Biological Science (BSED-BIOSCI) 
 Bachelor of Secondary Education Major in Technology and Livelihood Education (BSED-TLE) with GR No. 013
 Bachelor of Science in Information Technology (BSIT) with GR No. 033
 Bachelor of Science in Computer Engineering (BSCPE) with GR No. 039
 Bachelor of Science in Business Administration Major in Human Resource Development Management (BSBA-HRDM) with GR No. 056
 Bachelor of Science in Entrepreneurship with GR No. 061

On July 7, 2014, by virtue of Sangguniang Bayan ng Rodriguez Ordinance No. 14-15, and was later confirmed by the Sangguniang Panlalawigan ng Rizal Resolution No. 193 Series of 2014, Pamantasan ng Montalban was renamed Colegio de Montalban.

At present, Colegio de Montalban continues to work towards the holistic development of its students.

CHED-recognized (LUC) courses

Institute of Computer Studies 
Bachelor of Science In Computer Engineering (BSCpE)
Bachelor of Science In Information Technology (BSIT)

Institute of Education 
Bachelor of Elementary Education Generalist (BEEd -GEN)
Bachelor of Secondary Education - (Major In Science) (BSEd - SCI)

Institute of Business 
Bachelor of Science In Entrepreneurship (BSE)
Bachelor of Science In Business Administration - (Major In Human Resource Management)  (BSBA - HRDM)

Scholarship 
CdM offers free tuition and other school fees under the Universal Access to Quality Tertiary Education Act of 2017 or RA 10931.

References

External links
  
 

Universities and colleges in Rizal
Local colleges and universities in the Philippines
Education in Rodriguez, Rizal